The 2017 Copa Constitució was the 25th version of the national football knockout tournament involving teams from Andorra. The cup began on 7 February 2017 and ended on 28 May 2017 with the final.

Format
Similar to the previous year, the Copa Constitució was a single elimination tournament between 12 teams. There were eight teams from the Primera Divisió and four from the Segona Divisió. The winner, UE Santa Coloma, earned a place in the Europa League.

Schedule

First round
Eight teams competed in the first round. The matches were played on 7–15 February 2017.

|}

Quarter-finals
Eight teams competed in the quarter-finals. The matches were played on 22 March and 2 April 2017.

|}

Semi-finals
The four quarter-final winners competed in the semi-finals. The matches were played on 12–13 April 2017.

|}

Final
The cup final was played on 28 May 2017.

See also
2016–17 Primera Divisió
2016–17 Segona Divisió

External links
scoresway.com
UEFA

References

Andorra
Cup
2017